Oenopota komakahida is a species of sea snail, a marine gastropod mollusk in the family Mangeliidae.

Description

Distribution
This marine species is endemic to Japan found at depths between 200 m and 350 m; and has also fossil records.

References

 Otuka, Y., 1949: Fossil Mollusca and rocks of the Kiyosumi group exposed at Minato-machi, Chiba Prefecture, and its environs (1st paper). Japanese Journal of Geology and Geography, vol. 21, nos. 1–4, pp. 295–309, pl. 13.

External links
 Kazutaka Amano and Mikiko Watanabe ,  Taxonomy and distribution of Plio-Pleistocene Buccinum ; Paleontological Research, vol. 5, no. 3, pp. 215–226, September 28,2001

komakahida
Gastropods described in 1949